The painted turtle (Chrysemys picta) is the most widespread native turtle of North America. It lives in slow-moving fresh waters, from southern Canada to northern Mexico, and from the Atlantic to the Pacific. They have been shown to prefer large wetlands with long periods of inundation and emergent vegetation. This turtle is a member of the genus Chrysemys, which is part of the pond turtle family Emydidae. Fossils show that the painted turtle existed 15 million years ago. Three regionally based subspecies (the eastern, midland, and western) evolved during the last ice age. The southern painted turtle (C. dorsalis) is alternately considered the only other species in Chrysemys, or another subspecies of C. picta.

The adult painted turtle is 13–25 cm (5–10 in) long; the male is smaller than the female. The turtle's top shell is dark and smooth, without a ridge. Its skin is olive to black with red, orange, or yellow stripes on its extremities. The subspecies can be distinguished by their shells: the eastern has straight-aligned top shell segments; the midland has a large gray mark on the bottom shell; the western has a red pattern on the bottom shell.

The turtle eats aquatic vegetation, algae, and small water creatures including insects, crustaceans, and fish. Painted turtles primarily feed while in water and are able to locate and subdue prey even in heavily clouded conditions. Although they are frequently consumed as eggs or hatchlings by rodents, canines, and snakes, the adult turtles' hard shells protect them from most predators. Reliant on warmth from its surroundings, the painted turtle is active only during the day when it basks for hours on logs or rocks. During winter, the turtle hibernates, usually in the mud at the bottom of water bodies. The turtles mate in spring and autumn. Females dig nests on land and lay eggs between late spring and mid-summer. Hatched turtles grow until sexual maturity: 2–9 years for males, 6–16 for females.

In the traditional tales of Algonquian tribes, the colorful turtle played the part of a trickster. In modern times, four U.S. states (Colorado, Illinois, Michigan, and Vermont) have named the painted turtle their official reptile. While habitat loss and road killings have reduced the turtle's population, its ability to live in human-disturbed settings has helped it remain the most abundant turtle in North America. Adults in the wild can live for more than 55 years.

Taxonomy and evolution

The painted turtle (C. picta) is the only species in the genus Chrysemys. The parent family for Chrysemys is Emydidae: the pond turtles. Emydidae is split into two sub families; Chrysemys is part of the Deirochelyinae (Western Hemisphere) branch. The four subspecies of the painted turtle are the eastern (C. p. picta), midland (C. p. marginata), southern (C. p. dorsalis), and western (C. p. bellii).

The painted turtle's generic name is derived from the Ancient Greek words for "gold" (chryso) and "freshwater tortoise" (emys); the species name originates from the Latin for "colored" (pictus). The subspecies name, marginata, derives from the Latin for "border" and refers to the red markings on the outer (marginal) part of the upper shell; dorsalis is from the Latin for "back", referring to the prominent dorsal stripe; and bellii honors English zoologist Thomas Bell, a collaborator of Charles Darwin. An alternate East Coast common name for the painted turtle is "skilpot", from the Dutch for turtle, schildpad.

Classification
Originally described in 1783 by Johann Gottlob Schneider as Testudo picta, the painted turtle was called Chrysemys picta first by John Edward Gray in 1855. Four subspecies were then recognized: the eastern by Schneider in 1783, the western by Gray in 1831, and the midland and southern by Louis Agassiz in 1857, though the southern painted turtle is now generally considered a full species.

Subspecies

Although the subspecies of painted turtle intergrade (blend together) at range boundaries they are distinct within the hearts of their ranges.

The upper shell is olive green to black and may possess a pale stripe down the middle and red markings on the periphery. The segments (scutes) of the top shell have pale leading edges and occur in straight rows across the back, unlike all other North American turtles, including the other three subspecies of painted turtle, which have alternating segments. The bottom shell is plain yellow or lightly spotted. Sometimes as few as one dark grey spot near the lower center of the shell.
The centrally located midland is the hardest to distinguish from the other three subspecies. Its bottom shell has a characteristic symmetrical dark shadow in the center which varies in size and prominence.
Its top shell has a mesh-like pattern of light lines, and the top stripe present in other subspecies is missing or faint. Its bottom shell has a large colored splotch that spreads to the edges (further than the midland) and often has red hues.

Until the 1930s many of the subspecies of the painted turtle were labeled by biologists as full species within Chrysemys, but this varied by the researcher. The painted turtles in the border region between the western and midland subspecies were sometimes considered a full species, treleasei. In 1931, Bishop and Schmidt defined the current "four in one" taxonomy of species and subspecies. Based on comparative measurements of turtles from throughout the range, they subordinated species to subspecies and eliminated treleasei.

Since at least 1958, the subspecies were thought to have evolved in response to geographic isolation during the last ice age, 100,000 to 11,000 years ago. At that time painted turtles were divided into three different populations: eastern painted turtles along the southeastern Atlantic coast; southern painted turtles around the southern Mississippi River; and western painted turtles in the southwestern United States. The populations were not completely isolated for sufficiently long, hence wholly different species never evolved. When the glaciers retreated, about 11,000 years ago, all three subspecies moved north. The western and southern subspecies met in Missouri and hybridized to produce the midland painted turtle, which then moved east and north through the Ohio and Tennessee river basins.

Biologists have long debated the genera of closely related subfamily-mates Chrysemys, Pseudemys (cooters), and Trachemys (sliders). After 1952, some combined Pseudemys and Chrysemys because of similar appearance. In 1964, based on measurements of the skull and feet, Samuel B. McDowell proposed all three genera be merged into one. However, further measurements, in 1967, contradicted this taxonomic arrangement. Also in 1967, J. Alan Holman, a paleontologist and herpetologist, pointed out that, although the three turtles were often found together in nature and had similar mating patterns, they did not crossbreed. In the 1980s, studies of turtles' cell structures, biochemistries, and parasites further indicated that Chrysemys, Pseudemys, and Trachemys should remain in separate genera.

In 2003, Starkey et al. proposed that Chrysemys dorsalis, formerly considered a subspecies of C. picta, to be a distinct species sister to all subspecies in C. picta. Although this proposal was largely unrecognized at the time due to evidence of hybridization between dorsalis and picta, the Turtle Taxonomy Working Group and the Reptile Database have since followed through with it, although both the subspecific and specific names have been recognized.

Fossils

Although its evolutionary history—what the forerunner to the species was and how the close relatives branched off—is not well understood, the painted turtle is common in the fossil record. The oldest samples, found in Nebraska, date to about 15 million years ago. Fossils from 15 million to about 5 million years ago are restricted to the Nebraska-Kansas area, but more recent fossils are gradually more widely distributed. Fossils newer than 300,000 years old are found in almost all the United States and southern Canada.

DNA
The turtle's karyotype (nuclear DNA, rather than mitochondrial DNA) consists of 50 chromosomes, the same number as the rest of its subfamily-mates and the most common number for Emydidae turtles in general. Less well-related turtles have from 26 to 66 chromosomes. Little systematic study of variations of the painted turtle's karotype among populations has been done. (However, in 1967, research on protein structure of offshore island populations in New England, showed differences from mainland turtles.)

Comparison of subspecies chromosomal DNA has been discussed, to help address the debate over Starkey's proposed taxonomy, but as of 2009 had not been reported. The complete sequencing of the genetic code for the painted turtle was at a "draft assembled" state in 2010. The turtle was one of two reptiles chosen to be first sequenced.

Description

The shell is oval, smooth with little grooves where the large scale-like plates overlap, and flat-bottomed. The color of the top shell (carapace) varies from olive to black. Darker specimens are more common where the bottom of the water body is darker. The bottom shell (plastron) is yellow, sometimes red, sometimes with dark markings in the center. Similar to the top shell, the turtle's skin is olive to black, but with red and yellow stripes on its neck, legs, and tail. As with other pond turtles, such as the bog turtle, the painted turtle's feet are webbed to aid swimming.

The head of the turtle is distinctive. The face has only yellow stripes, with a large yellow spot and streak behind each eye, and on the chin two wide yellow stripes that meet at the tip of the jaw. The turtle's upper jaw is shaped into an inverted "V" (philtrum), with a downward-facing, tooth-like projection on each side.

The hatchling has a proportionally larger head, eyes, and tail, and a more circular shell than the adult. The adult female is generally longer than the male,  versus . For a given length, the female has a higher (more rounded, less flat) top shell. The female's greater body volume supports her egg-production. The male has longer foreclaws and a longer, thicker tail, with the anus (cloaca) located further out on the tail.

Similar species

The painted turtle has a very similar appearance to the red-eared slider (the most common pet turtle) and the two are often confused. The painted turtle can be distinguished because it is flatter than the slider. Also, the slider has a prominent red marking on the side of its head (the "ear") and a spotted bottom shell, both features missing in the painted turtle.

Distribution

Range

The most widespread North American turtle, the painted turtle is the only turtle whose native range extends from the Atlantic to the Pacific. It is native to eight of Canada's ten provinces, forty-five of the fifty United States, and one of Mexico's thirty-one states. On the East Coast, it lives from the Canadian Maritimes to the U.S. state of Georgia. On the West Coast, it lives in British Columbia, Washington, and Oregon and offshore on southeast Vancouver Island. The northernmost American turtle, its range includes much of southern Canada. To the south, its range reaches the U.S. Gulf Coast in Louisiana and Alabama. In the southwestern United States there are only dispersed populations. It is found in one river in extreme northern Mexico. It is absent in a part of southwestern Virginia and the adjacent states as well as in north-central Alabama.

The borders between the four subspecies are not sharp, because the subspecies interbreed. Many studies have been performed in the border regions to assess the intermediate turtles, usually by comparing the anatomical features of hybrids that result from intergradation of the classical subspecies. Despite the imprecision, the subspecies are assigned nominal ranges.

Eastern painted turtle

The eastern painted turtle ranges from southeastern Canada to Georgia with a western boundary at approximately the Appalachians. At its northern extremes, the turtle tends to be restricted to the warmer areas closer to the Atlantic Ocean. It is uncommon in far north New Hampshire and in Maine is common only in a strip about 50 miles from the coast. In Canada, it lives in New Brunswick and Nova Scotia but not in Quebec or Prince Edward Island. To the south it is not found in the coastal lowlands of southern North Carolina, South Carolina, or Georgia, or in southern Georgia in general or at all in Florida.

In the northeast, there is extensive mixing with the midland subspecies, and some writers have called these turtles a "hybrid swarm". In the southeast, the border between the eastern and midland is more sharp as mountain chains separate the subspecies to different drainage basins.

Midland painted turtle

The midland painted turtle lives from southern Ontario and Quebec, through the eastern U.S. Midwest states, to Kentucky, Tennessee and northwestern Alabama, where it intergrades with the southern painted turtle. It also is found eastward through West Virginia, western Maryland and Pennsylvania. The midland painted turtle appears to be moving east, especially in Pennsylvania. To the northeast it is found in western New York and much of Vermont, and it intergrades extensively with the eastern subspecies.

Western painted turtle

The western painted turtle's northern range includes southern parts of western Canada from Ontario through Manitoba, Saskatchewan, Alberta and British Columbia. In Ontario, the western subspecies is found north of Minnesota and directly north of Lake Superior, but there is a  gap to the east of Lake Superior (in the area of harshest winter climate) where no painted turtles of any subspecies occur. Thus Ontario's western subspecies does not intergrade with the midland painted turtle of southeastern Ontario. In Manitoba, the turtle is numerous and ranges north to Lake Manitoba and the lower part of Lake Winnipeg. The turtle is also common in south Saskatchewan, but in Alberta, there may only be 100 individuals, all found very near the U.S. border, mostly in the southeast.

In British Columbia, populations exist in the interior in the vicinity of the Kootenai, Columbia, Okanagan, and Thompson river valleys. At the coast, turtles occur near the mouth of the Fraser and a bit further north, as well as the bottom of Vancouver Island, and some other nearby islands. Within British Columbia, the turtle's range is not continuous and can better be understood as northward extensions of the range from the United States. High mountains present barriers to east–west movement of the turtles within the province or from Alberta. Some literature has shown isolated populations much further north in British Columbia and Alberta, but these were probably pet-releases.

In the United States, the western subspecies forms a wide intergrade area with the midland subspecies covering much of Illinois as well as a strip of Wisconsin along Lake Michigan and part of the Upper Peninsula of Michigan (UP). Further west, the rest of Illinois, Wisconsin and the UP are part of the range proper, as are all of Minnesota and Iowa, as well as all of Missouri except a narrow strip in the south. All of North Dakota is within range, all of South Dakota except a very small area in the west, and all of Nebraska. Almost all of Kansas is in range; the border of that state with Oklahoma is roughly the species range border, but the turtle is found in three counties of north central Oklahoma.

To the northwest, almost all of Montana is in range. Only a narrow strip in the west, along most of the Idaho border (which is at the Continental Divide) lacks turtles. Wyoming is almost entirely out of range; only the lower elevation areas near the eastern and northern borders have painted turtles. In Idaho, the turtles are found throughout the far north (upper half of the Idaho Panhandle). Recently, separate Idaho populations have been observed in the southwest (near the Payette and Boise rivers) and the southeast (near St. Anthony). In Washington state, turtles are common throughout the state within lower elevation river valleys. In Oregon, the turtle is native to the northern part of the state throughout the Columbia River Valley as well as the Willamette River Valley north of Salem.

To the southwest, the painted turtle's range is fragmented. In Colorado, while range is continuous in the eastern, prairie, half of the state, it is absent in most of the western, mountainous, part of the state. However, the turtle is confirmed present in the lower elevation southwest part of the state (Archuleta and La Plata counties), where a population ranges into northern New Mexico in the San Juan River basin. In New Mexico, the main distribution follows the Rio Grande and the Pecos River, two waterways that run in a north–south direction through the state. Within the aforementioned rivers, it is also found in the northern part of Far West Texas. In Utah, the painted turtle lives in an area to the south (Kane County) in streams draining into the Colorado River, although it is disputed if they are native. In Arizona, the painted turtle is native to an area in the east, Lyman Lake. The painted turtle is not native to Nevada or California.

In Mexico, painted turtles have been found about 50 miles south of New Mexico near Galeana in the state of Chihuahua. There, two expeditions found the turtles in the Rio Santa Maria which is in a closed basin.

Human-introduced range

Pet releases are starting to establish the painted turtle outside its native range. It has been introduced into waterways near Phoenix, Arizona, and to Germany, Indonesia, the Philippines, and Spain.

Habitat

To thrive, painted turtles need fresh waters with soft bottoms, basking sites, and aquatic vegetation. They find their homes in shallow waters with slow-moving currents, such as creeks, marshes, ponds, and the shores of lakes. The subspecies have evolved different habitat preferences.

The eastern painted turtle is very aquatic, leaving the immediate vicinity of its water body only when forced by drought to migrate. Along the Atlantic, painted turtles have appeared in brackish waters. 
The midland and southern painted turtles seek especially quiet waters, usually shores and coves. They favor shallows that contain dense vegetation and have an unusual toleration of pollution.
The western painted turtle lives in streams and lakes, similar to the other painted turtles, but also inhabits pasture ponds and roadside pools.

Population features

Within much of its range, the painted turtle is the most abundant turtle species. Population densities range from 10 to 840 turtles per hectare (2.5 acres) of water surface. Warmer climates produce higher relative densities among populations, and habitat desirability also influences density. Rivers and large lakes have lower densities because only the shore is desirable habitat; the central, deep waters skew the surface-based estimates. Also, lake and river turtles have to make longer linear trips to access equivalent amounts of foraging space.

Adults outnumber juveniles in most populations, but gauging the ratios is difficult because juveniles are harder to catch; with current sampling methods, estimates of age distribution vary widely. Annual survival rate of painted turtles increases with age. The probability of a painted turtle surviving from the egg to its first birthday is only 19%. For females, the annual survival rate rises to 45% for juveniles and 95% for adults. The male survival rates follow a similar pattern, but are probably lower overall than females, as evidenced by the average male age being lower than that of the female. Natural disasters can confound age distributions. For instance, a hurricane can destroy many nests in a region, resulting in fewer hatchlings the next year. Age distributions may also be skewed by migrations of adults.

To understand painted turtle adult age distributions, researchers require reliable methods. Turtles younger than four years (up to 12 years in some populations) can be aged based on "growth rings" in their shells. For older turtles, some attempts have been made to determine age based on size and shape of their shells or legs using mathematical models, but this method is more uncertain. The most reliable method to study the long-lived turtles is to capture them, permanently mark their shells by notching with a drill, release the turtles, and then recapture them in later years. The longest-running study, in Michigan, has shown that painted turtles can live more than 55 years.

Adult sex ratios of painted turtle populations average around 1:1. Many populations are slightly male-heavy, but some are strongly female-imbalanced; one population in Ontario has a female to male ratio of 4:1. Hatchling sex ratio varies based on egg temperature. During the middle third of incubation, temperatures of  produce males, and anything above or below that, females. It does not appear that females choose nesting sites to influence the sex of the hatchlings; within a population, nests will vary sufficiently to give both male and female-heavy broods.

Ecology

Diet

The painted turtle is a bottom-dwelling hunter. It quickly juts its head into and out of vegetation to stir potential victims out into the open water, where they are pursued. Large prey is ripped apart with the forefeet as the turtle holds it in its mouth. It also consumes plants and skims the surface of the water with its mouth open to catch small particles of food.

Although all subspecies of painted turtle eat both plants and animals (in the form of leaves, algae, fish, crustaceans, aquatic insects and carrion), their specific diets vary.

Painted turtles obtain coloration from carotenoids in their natural diet by eating algae and a variety of aquatic plants from their environment.Stripes and spots increase red and yellow chroma and decrease UV chroma and brightness in turtles with large amounts of carotenoids in their diet compared to the stripes and spots of turtles with only moderate amounts of carotenoids in their diet.

The eastern painted turtle's diet is the least studied. It prefers to eat in the water, but has been observed eating on land. The fish it consumes are typically dead or injured.
The midland painted turtle eats mostly aquatic insects and both vascular and non-vascular plants.
The western painted turtle's consumption of plants and animals changes seasonally. In early summer, 60% of its diet comprises insects. In late summer, 55% includes plants. Of note, the western painted turtle aids in the dispersal of white water-lily seeds. The turtle consumes the hard-coated seeds, which remain viable after passing through the turtle, and disperses them through its feces.

Predators

Painted turtles are most vulnerable to predators when young. Nests are frequently ransacked and the eggs eaten by garter snakes, crows, chipmunks, thirteen-lined ground and gray squirrels, skunks, groundhogs, raccoons, badgers, gray and red fox, and humans. The small and sometimes bite-size, numerous hatchlings fall prey to water bugs, bass, catfish, bullfrogs, snapping turtles, three types of snakes (copperheads, racers and water snakes), herons, rice rats, weasels, muskrats, minks, and raccoons. As adults, the turtles' armored shells protect them from many potential predators, but they still occasionally fall prey to alligators, ospreys, crows, red-shouldered hawks, bald eagles, and especially raccoons.

Painted turtles defend themselves by kicking, scratching, biting, or urinating. In contrast to land tortoises, painted turtles can right themselves if they are flipped upside down.

Life cycle

Mating

Females begin their reproductive cycles in mid-summer, and ovulate the following spring.

Courtship begins when a male follows a female until he meets her face-to-face. He then strokes her face and neck with his elongated front claws, a gesture returned by a receptive female. The pair repeat the process several times, with the male retreating from and then returning to the female until she swims to the bottom, where they copulate. As the male is smaller than the female, he is not dominant. Although not directly observed, evidence indicates that the male will inflict injury on the female in attempts of coercion. Males will use their tooth-like cusps on their beaks and their foreclaws during this act of coercion with the female. The female stores sperm, to be used for up to three clutches, in her oviducts; the sperm may remain viable for up to three years. A single clutch may have multiple fathers.

Egg-laying

Nesting is done, by the females only, between late May and mid-July. The nests are vase-shaped and are usually dug in sandy soil, often at sites with southern exposures. Females may return to the same sites several consecutive years, but if several females make their nests close together, the eggs become more vulnerable to predators. Female eastern painted turtles have been shown to nest together, possibly even participating in communal nesting.

If the weather is unsuitable, for instance a too hot night in the Southeast, she delays the process until later at night. Painted turtles in Virginia have been observed waiting three weeks to nest because of a hot drought.

While preparing to dig her nest, the female sometimes exhibits a mysterious preliminary behavior. She presses her throat against the ground of different potential sites, perhaps sensing moisture, warmth, texture, or smell, although her exact motivation is unknown. She may further temporize by excavating several false nests as the wood turtles also do.

The female relies on her hind feet for digging. She may accumulate so much sand and mud on her feet that her mobility is reduced, making her vulnerable to predators. To lighten her labors, she lubricates the area with her bladder water. Once the nest is complete, the female deposits into the hole. The freshly laid eggs are white, elliptical, porous, and flexible. From start to finish, the female's work may take four hours. Sometimes she remains on land overnight afterwards, before returning to her home water.

Females can lay five clutches per year, but two is a normal average after including the 30–50% of a population's females that do not produce any clutches in a given year. In some northern populations, no females lay more than one clutch per year. Bigger females tend to lay bigger eggs and more eggs per clutch. Clutch sizes of the subspecies vary, although the differences may reflect different environments, rather than different genetics. The two more northerly subspecies, western and midland, are larger and have more eggs per clutch—11.9 and 7.6, respectively—than the eastern (4.9). Within subspecies, also, the more northerly females lay larger clutches.

Growth

Incubation lasts 72–80 days in the wild and for a similar period in artificial conditions. In August and September, the young turtle breaks out from its egg, using a special projection of its jaw called the egg tooth. Not all offspring leave the nest immediately, though. Hatchlings north of a line from Nebraska to northern Illinois to New Jersey typically arrange themselves symmetrically in the nest and overwinter to emerge the following spring.

The hatchling's ability to survive winter in the nest has allowed the painted turtle to extend its range farther north than any other American turtle. The painted turtle is genetically adapted to survive extended periods of subfreezing temperatures with blood that can remain supercooled and skin that resists penetration from ice crystals in the surrounding ground. The hardest freezes nevertheless kill many hatchlings.

Immediately after hatching, turtles are dependent on egg yolk material for sustenance. About a week to a week and a half after emerging from their eggs (or the following spring if emergence is delayed), hatchlings begin feeding to support growth. The young turtles grow rapidly at first, sometimes doubling their size in the first year. Growth slows sharply at sexual maturity and may stop completely. Likely owing to differences of habitat and food by water body, growth rates often differ from population to population in the same area. Among the subspecies, the western painted turtles are the quickest growers.

Females grow faster than males overall, and must be larger to mature sexually. In most populations males reach sexual maturity at 2–4 years old, and females at 6–10. Size and age at maturity increase with latitude; at the northern edge of their range, males reach sexual maturity at 7–9 years of age and females at 11–16.

Behavior

Daily routine and basking

A cold-blooded reptile, the painted turtle regulates its temperature through its environment, notably by basking. All ages bask for warmth, often alongside other species of turtle. Sometimes more than 50 individuals are seen on one log together. Turtles bask on a variety of objects, often logs, but have even been seen basking on top of common loons that were covering eggs.

The turtle starts its day at sunrise, emerging from the water to bask for several hours. Warmed for activity, it returns to the water to forage. After becoming chilled, the turtle re-emerges for one to two more cycles of basking and feeding. At night, the turtle drops to the bottom of its water body or perches on an underwater object and sleeps.

When fighting infection, it manipulates its temperature up to 5 °C (8 °F) higher than normal.

Seasonal routine and hibernation

In the spring, when the water reaches , the turtle begins actively foraging. However, if the water temperature exceeds , the turtle will not feed. In fall, the turtle stops foraging when temperatures drop below the spring set-point.

During the winter, the turtle hibernates. In the north, the inactive season may be as long as from October to March, while the southernmost populations may not hibernate at all. While hibernating, the body temperature of the painted turtle averages . Periods of warm weather bring the turtle out of hibernation, and even in the north, individuals have been seen basking in February.

The painted turtle hibernates by burying itself, either on the bottom of a body of water, near water in the shore-bank or the burrow of a muskrat, or in woods or pastures. Within the mud, it may dig down an additional . In this state, the turtle does not breathe, although if surroundings allow, it may get some oxygen through its skin. The species is one of the best-studied vertebrates able to survive long periods without oxygen. Adaptations of its blood chemistry, brain, heart, and particularly its shell allow the turtle to survive extreme lactic acid buildup while oxygen-deprived.

Anoxia tolerance 
During the winter months, painted turtles become ice-locked and spend their time in either hypoxic (low oxygen) or anoxic (no oxygen) regions of the pond or lake. Painted turtles essentially hold their breath until the following spring when the ice melts. As a result, painted turtles rely on anaerobic respiration, which leads to the production of lactic acid. However, painted turtles can tolerate long periods of anoxia due to three factors: a depressed metabolic rate, large glycogen stores in the liver, and sequestering lactate in the shell and releasing carbonate buffers to the extracellular fluid.

The shell of an adult painted turtle has the largest concentration of carbonate content recorded among animals. This large carbonate content helps the painted turtle buffer the accumulation of lactic acid during anoxia. Both the shell and skeleton release calcium and magnesium carbonates to buffer extracellular lactic acid. A painted turtle can also sequester 44% of total body lactate in their shell. Despite the shell's large buffering contribution, it does not experience any significant decrease in mechanical properties under natural conditions.

The duration of anoxia tolerance varies depending on the sub-species of painted turtle. The western painted turtle (C. picta bellii) can survive 170 days of anoxia, followed by the midland painted turtle (C. picta marginata) which can survive 150 days, and finally the eastern painted turtle (C. picta picta)  which can survive 125 days.  Differences in anoxia tolerance are partially attributed to the rate of lactate production and buffering capability in painted turtles. Furthermore, northern populations of painted turtles have a higher anoxia tolerance than southern populations.

Other anoxia tolerant freshwater turtles include: the southern painted turtle (Chrysemys dorsalis), which can survive 75–86 days of anoxia, the snapping turtle (Chelydra serpentina), which can survive 100 days under anoxia, and the map turtle (Graptemys geographica), which can survive 50 days of anoxia. One reason for the difference in duration between more anoxia-tolerant species and less anoxia-tolerant species is the turtle's ability to buffer lactic acid accumulation during anoxia.

Unlike adult painted turtles, hatchlings can survive only 40 days, but still exhibit high anoxia tolerance and freeze tolerance compared to other hatchling species (30 days for Chelydra serpentina, and 15 days for Graptemys geographica) due to cold winters.

Movement

Searching for water, food, or mates, the painted turtles travel up to several kilometers at a time. During summer, in response to heat and water-clogging vegetation, the turtles may vacate shallow marshes for more permanent waters. Short overland migrations may involve hundreds of turtles together. If heat and drought are prolonged, the turtles will bury themselves and, in extreme cases, die.

Foraging turtles frequently cross lakes or travel linearly down creeks. Daily crossings of large ponds have been observed. Tag and release studies show that sex also drives turtle movement. Males move the most and are most likely to change wetlands because they seek mates.

The painted turtles, through visual recognition, have homing capabilities. Many individuals can return to their collection points after being released elsewhere, trips that may require them to traverse land. One experiment placed 98 turtles varying several-kilometer distances from their home wetland; 41 returned. Another experiment found that if placed far enough away from water the turtles will just walk in straight paths and not orient towards water or in any specific direction which indicates a lack of homing ability. Females may use homing to help locate suitable nesting sites.

Eastern painted turtle movements may contribute to aquatic plant seed dispersal. A study done in Massachusetts found that the quantity of intact macrophyte seeds defecated by Eastern painted turtles can be high and that the seeds of specifically Nymphaea ordorata that were found in feces were capable of moderate to high level germination. As turtles move between ponds and habitats, they carry seeds along with them to new locations.

Interaction with humans

Conservation

The species is currently classified as least concern by the IUCN but populations have been subject to decline locally.

The decline in painted turtle populations is not a simple matter of dramatic range reduction, like that of the American bison. Instead the turtle is classified as G5 (demonstrably widespread) in its Natural Heritage Global Rank, and the IUCN rates it as a species of least concern. The painted turtle's high reproduction rate and its ability to survive in polluted wetlands and artificially made ponds have allowed it to maintain its range, but the post-Columbus settlement of North America has reduced its numbers.

Only within the Pacific Northwest is the turtle's range eroding. Even there, in Washington, the painted turtle is designated S5 (demonstrably widespread). However, in Oregon, the painted turtle is designated S2 (imperiled), and in British Columbia, the turtle's populations in the Coast and Interior regions are labeled "endangered" and "of special concern", respectively.

Much is written about the different factors that threaten the painted turtle, but they are unquantified, with only inferences of relative importance. A primary threat category is habitat loss in various forms. Related to water habitat, there is drying of wetlands, clearing of aquatic logs or rocks (basking sites), and clearing of shoreline vegetation, which allows more predator access or increased human foot traffic. Related to nesting habitat, urbanization or planting can remove needed sunny soils.

Another significant human impact is roadkill—dead turtles, especially females, are commonly seen on summer roads. In addition to direct killing, roads genetically isolate some populations. Localities have tried to limit roadkill by constructing underpasses, highway barriers, and crossing signs. Oregon has introduced public education on turtle awareness, safe swerving, and safely assisting turtles across the road.

In the West, human-introduced bass, bullfrogs, and especially snapping turtles, have increased the predation of hatchlings. Outside the Southeast, where sliders are native, released pet red-eared slider turtles increasingly compete with painted turtles. In cities, increased urban predators (raccoons, canines, and felines) may impact painted turtles by eating their eggs.

Other factors of concern for the painted turtles include over-collection from the wild, released pets introducing diseases or reducing genetic variability, pollution, boating traffic, angler's hooks (the turtles are noteworthy bait-thieves), wanton shooting, and crushing by agricultural machines or golf course lawnmowers or all-terrain vehicles. Gervais and colleagues note that research itself impacts the populations and that much funded turtle trapping work has not been published. They advocate discriminating more on what studies are done, thereby putting fewer turtles into scientists' traps. Global warming represents an uncharacterized future threat.

As the most common turtle in Nova Scotia, the eastern painted turtle is not listed under the Species at Risk Act for conservation requirements.

Pets and other uses

According to a trade data study, painted turtles were the second most popular pet turtles after red-eared sliders in the early 1990s. As of 2010, most U.S. states allow, but discourage, painted turtle pets, although Oregon forbids keeping them as pets, and Indiana prohibits their sale. However, a loophole for scientific samples allows some small turtles to be sold, and illegal trafficking also occurs.

Painted turtle pet-keeping requirements are similar to those of the red-eared slider. Keepers are urged to provide them with adequate space and a basking site, and water that is regularly filtered and changed. Aquatic turtles are generally unsuitable pets for children, as they do not enjoy being held. Hobbyists have maintained turtles in captivity for decades. Painted turtles are long-lived pets, and have a lifespan of up to 40 years in captivity.

The painted turtle is sometimes eaten but is not highly regarded as food, as even the largest subspecies, the western painted turtle, is inconveniently small and larger turtles are available. Schools frequently dissect painted turtles, which are sold by biological supply companies; specimens often come from the wild but may be captive-bred. In the Midwest, turtle racing is popular at summer fairs.

Capture

Commercial harvesting of painted turtles in the wild is controversial and, increasingly, restricted. Wisconsin formerly had virtually unrestricted trapping of painted turtles but based on qualitative observations forbade all commercial harvesting in 1997. Neighboring Minnesota, where trappers collected more than 300,000 painted turtles during the 1990s, commissioned a study of painted turtle harvesting. Scientists found that harvested lakes averaged half the painted turtle density of off-limit lakes, and population modeling suggested that unrestricted harvests could produce a large decline in turtle populations. In response, Minnesota forbade new harvesters in 2002 and limited trap numbers. Although harvesting continued, subsequent takes averaged half those of the 1990s. As of 2009, painted turtles faced virtually unlimited harvesting in Arkansas, Iowa, Missouri, Ohio, and Oklahoma; since then, Missouri has prohibited their harvesting.

Individuals who trap painted turtles typically do so to earn additional income, selling a few thousand a year at $1–2 each. Many trappers have been involved in the trade for generations, and value it as a family activity. Some harvesters disagree with limiting the catch, saying the populations are not dropping.

Many U.S. state fish and game departments allow non-commercial taking of painted turtles under a creel limit, and require a fishing (sometimes hunting) license; others completely forbid the recreational capture of painted turtles. Trapping is not allowed in Oregon, where western painted turtle populations are in decline, and in Missouri, where there are populations of both southern and western subspecies. In Canada, Ontario protects both subspecies present, the midland and western, and British Columbia protects its dwindling western painted turtles.

Capture methods are also regulated by locality. Typically trappers use either floating "basking traps" or partially submerged, baited "hoop traps". Trapper opinions, commercial records, and scientific studies show that basking traps are more effective for collecting painted turtles, while the hoop traps work better for collecting "meat turtles" (snapping turtles and soft-shell turtles). Nets, hand capture, and fishing with set lines are generally legal, but shooting, chemicals, and explosives are forbidden.

Culture

Native American tribes were familiar with the painted turtle—young braves were trained to recognize its splashing into water as an alarm—and incorporated it in folklore. A Potawatomi myth describes how the talking turtles, "Painted Turtle" and allies "Snapping Turtle" and "Box Turtle", outwit the village women. Painted Turtle is the star of the legend and uses his distinctive markings to trick a woman into holding him so he can bite her. An Illini myth recounts how Painted Turtle put his paint on to entice a chief's daughter into the water.

As of 2010, four U.S. states designated the painted turtle as official reptile. Vermont honored the reptile in 1994, following the suggestion of Cornwall Elementary School students. In 1995, Michigan followed, based on the recommendation of Niles fifth graders, who discovered the state lacked an official reptile. Illinois citizens, in 2004, voted to select the painted turtle as their state reptile and the legislature made it official in 2005. Colorado chose the western painted turtle in 2008, following the efforts of two succeeding years of Jay Biachi's fourth grade classes. In New York, the painted turtle narrowly lost (5,048 to 5,005, versus the common snapping turtle) a 2006 statewide student election for state reptile.

In the border town of Boissevain, Manitoba, a  western painted turtle, Tommy the Turtle, is a roadside attraction. The statue was built in 1974 to celebrate the Canadian Turtle Derby, a festival including turtle races that ran from 1972 to 2001.

Another Canadian admirer of the painted turtle is Jon Montgomery, who won the 2010 Olympic gold medal in skeleton (a form of sled) racing, while wearing a painted turtle painting on the crown of his helmet, prominently visible when he slid downhill. Montgomery, who also iconically tattooed his chest with a maple-leaf, explained his visual promotion of the turtle, saying that he had assisted one to cross the road. BC Hydro referred to Montgomery's action when describing its own sponsorship of conservation research for the turtle in British Columbia.

Several private entities use the painted turtle as a symbol. Wayne State University Press operates an imprint "named after the Michigan state reptile" that "publishes books on regional topics of cultural and historical interest". In California, The Painted Turtle is a camp for ill children, founded by Paul Newman. Painted Turtle Winery of British Columbia trades on the "laid back and casual lifestyle" of the turtle with a "job description to bask in the sun". Also, there is an Internet company in Michigan, a guesthouse in British Columbia, and a café in Maine that use the painted turtle commercially.

In children's books, the painted turtle is a popular subject, with at least seven books published between 2000 and 2010.

Notes and references

Notes

Citations

Bibliography

External links

 Missouri Department of Conservation video of southern painted turtle (click video link): Note the discussion of red line on top of shell.
 

Deirochelyinae
Chrysemys
Turtles of North America
Reptiles of Canada
Reptiles of the United States
Fauna of the Eastern United States
Fauna of the Great Lakes region (North America)
Fauna of the Plains-Midwest (United States)
Reptiles of Ontario
Cryozoa
Reptiles described in 1783
Taxa named by John Edward Gray
Symbols of Colorado
Symbols of Michigan
Articles containing video clips
Langhian first appearances
Extant Miocene first appearances
Miocene turtles
Pliocene turtles
Quaternary turtles
Symbols of Illinois